Lake Lakengren (lock-n-grin, a Viking name meaning “Lake of the emerald green hills”) is an unincorporated community and census-designated place in Gasper Township, Preble County, Ohio, United States. The population was 3,387 at the 2020 census.

History
Lake Lakengren had its start in the late 1960s as a planned community.

References

Unincorporated communities in Preble County, Ohio
Unincorporated communities in Ohio